Michael Cullen Cotton was a politician in the New South Wales Legislative Assembly during the early colonial period.

Cotton served as collector of customs from 1828 to 1834 replacing John Campbell. In 1829, he became a member of the newly extended Legislative Council. In 1833, he exchanged positions with John George Nathaniel Gibbes who was the Collector of Customs in the major East Anglian port of Great Yarmouth.

On 19 April 1836 he married Jane Mary Weller at St John's, Hamstead.

References

External link 

 Colonial Secretary's papers 1822-1877, State Library of Queensland- includes digitised correspondence and letters written by Cotton to the Colonial Secretary of New South Wales

Year of birth missing
Year of death missing
Place of birth missing
Place of death missing
Members of the New South Wales Legislative Council